France Pibernik (September 2, 1928 – April 21, 2021) was a Slovene poet, author, essayist, and literary historian.

Life
Pibernik was born in Suhadole. He attended high school in Kranj and then enrolled in Slavic studies in Ljubljana, where he graduated in 1955. Until 1958 he taught at a middle school at Dobrovo in the Gorizia Hills, and after that at the high school in Kranj until his retirement in 1990. In the foreword to his book Janez Jalen, it is written about Pibernik that "as for many knowledgeable and intellectually diverse people, it is also true of him that, in the years when their work lives are no longer at the forefront, they are even more active and productive."

Literary activity
Initially, Pibernik's poetry was close to Neo-Romantic currents, and it later developed in the direction of Modernism. His first poetry collection, Bregovi ulice (1960), was followed by more volumes, among which his poetry collection Ajdova znamenja is the most notable. The most important part of Pibernik's works on literature are the volumes Med tradicijo in modernizmom (Between Tradition and Modernism), Med modernizmom in avantgardo (Between Modernism and the Avant-Garde), and Čas romana (The Era of the Novel). The first two present the author's correspondence with poets, and Čas romana with the prose writers. As a literary historian, Pibernik focused on work written during the Second World War and by Slovenes in exile, which was suppressed in Slovenia for political and ideological reasons. These include volumes on the poetry of France Balantič and Ivan Hribovšek, the anthology Jutro pozabljenih (Dawn of the Forgotten, 1991), the volume Temni zaliv Franceta Balantiča (The Dark Bay of France Balantič), his study Slovenski dunajski krog 1941–1945 (The Slovenian Vienna Circle, 1941–1945), and his biography of Karel Mauser.

Poetry collections

 Bregovi ulice, 1960
 Ravnina, 1968
 Razlage, 1973
 September, 1974
 Odzvok – pesmi v prozi, 1979
 Ajdova znamenja – izbor, 1993
 Svetloba timijan, 2000

Literary history

 Med tradicijo in modernizmom: pričevanja o sodobni poeziji, 1978
 Med modernizmom in avantgardo: pričevanja o sodobni poeziji, 1981
 Čas romana: pogovori s slovenskimi pisatelji, 1983
 Temni zaliv Franceta Balantiča, 1989, 1990
 Slovenski dunajski krog 1941–1945, 1991
 Razmerja v sodobni slovenski dramatiki: pogovori, dopisovanja, razmišljanja, 1992
 Karel Mauser: življenje in delo, 1993
 Anton Vodnik, Zbrano delo (editor), 1993
 Ogledala sanj Jožeta Udoviča: dokumenti, pričevanja, komentarji, 1996
 Slovenska duhovna pesem: od Prešerna do danes, 2001
 Beseda čez ocean: antologija slovenske zdomske pozije, 2002
 Janez Jalen: življenjska in pisateljska pot v dokumentih, pričevanjih in razlagah, 2003
 Začudene oči otroštva (memoir), 2008
 France Balantič: življenjska in pesniška pot 1921–1943: literarna usoda po letu 1945, 2008
 Jože Udovič: Udovičeva poezija med realnostjo in vizijo z dvema proznima intermezzoma, 2008
 Ivan Hribovšek, Zbrano delo (editor), 2010
 Vladimir Truhlar, Zbrano delo (editor), 2011
 Vladimir Truhlar, 2016
 Anton Vodnik, 2012
 France Balantič, Zbrano delo (editor, series Zbrana dela slovenskih pesnikov in pisateljev), 2008
 Severin Šali: popotnik, zaljubljen v življenje, 2019

Research on suppressed writers
In his last decade, Pibernik devoted himself mainly to researching the lives and works of writers that were politically banned and suppressed under the communist regime in Slovenia. He published many books on this topic, starting with an anthology:

 Jutro pozabljenih: antologija padlih, pobitih, prepovedanih, zamolčanih, pozabljenih, 1991
 France Balantič, Tihi glas piščali (editor), 1991  
 Ivan Hribovšek, Himna večeru: izbrane pesmi (editor), 1993
 France Kunstelj, Luč na mojem pragu: izbrane črtice in novele (editor), 1994 
 Ludve Potokar, Onstran samote (editor), 1995
 Tone Polda, Moja Krnica, 1996
Pozni november za pesnika: biografska pripoved : France Balantič, 29. november 1921 – 24. november 1943, 2016
Dohojene stopinje: pogovori in dokumenti: 2000–2018 (with Zorko Simčič), 2019
Alojz Rebula: 1924-2018: dokumentarna monografija]] (1924–2018), 2019
Mož neuklonljivih ramen: pogovori s Francetom Pibernikom (junij–oktober 1998) (with Anton Drobnič), 2021

Recognitions and awards
2008: Trubar Award for exceptional contributions to the preservation of the Slovenian written cultural heritage, conferred by the National and University Library of Slovenia
2013: honorary citizen of Kranj
Honorary member of the Celje Hermagoras Society

References

1928 births
2021 deaths
Slovenian male poets
Slovenian essayists
Slovenian literary historians
Ethnic Slovene people
20th-century poets
People from the Municipality of Komenda